On the Track or Off  The Track is a TVB series released in 2001. It storyline revolves around the horse racing business.

characters:
Bondy Chui
Steven Ma
Frankie Lam
Ada choi

TVB dramas
2000s Hong Kong television series
2001 Hong Kong television series debuts
2001 Hong Kong television series endings